Davidman is a surname. Notable people with the surname include:

 Eleazar Davidman (1936–2007), Israeli tennis player
 Joy Davidman (1915–1960), American poet and writer
 Lynn Davidman (born 1955), American sociologist